Donnie Edwards (born April 6, 1973) is a former American football linebacker from San Diego, California. He played for thirteen seasons in the National Football League (NFL) for the Kansas City Chiefs and the San Diego Chargers.  He began his career as an All-American Collegiate at the University of California, Los Angeles. He was drafted by the Kansas City Chiefs in the fourth round of the 1996 NFL Draft.

Edwards retired as one of only eight players in the history of the NFL to record more than 20 interceptions and 20 sacks during his career. Since his retirement in 2009, Edwards has devoted himself to philanthropic work with the Best Defense Foundation and children from underprivileged backgrounds.

Early life
Edwards was born in Chula Vista, California, and is the second of eight brothers and sisters. Despite stark financial circumstances, Edwards excelled in school and athletics. As a slight linebacker at only 170 pounds, Edwards believed that academics would be his ticket to opportunity. He remains an active advocate for education and emphasizes this point in his work with schoolchildren.

College career
Edwards accepted a scholarship to UCLA where he played as a linebacker for UCLA from 1992 to 1995. Edwards left school ranked third in tackles for losses in school history with 38, and fifth in sacks in the school's history, with 22.5 sacks. He also tied the school record for sacks in a game with 4.5 sacks versus Southern Methodist University, and ranks second in school history for sacks in a single season, with 12.5 sacks. Following his junior year, he won third-team All-America honors. He also played baseball as a junior at first base and third base. Edwards was a member of the Alpha Rho chapter of Zeta Beta Tau fraternity at UCLA, and played center-field on the UCLA baseball team.

Professional career

First stint with Chiefs
Edwards was drafted in the 4th round (98th overall) of the 1996 NFL Draft by the Kansas City Chiefs.

On February 28, 2002, the Kansas City Chiefs officially released Edwards after they were unable to come to terms on a new contract. Edwards was released a day before receiving a $2.8 million bonus.

San Diego Chargers
On April 25, 2002, the San Diego Chargers signed Edwards to a five-year contract as an unrestricted free agent.

His first season with the squad, he made the 2002 Pro Bowl as an alternate. He was a starter for the Chargers since the time he joined the team. He averaged 154 tackles from 2003–2005, and made at least 100 tackles from 1997–2005.

After recording half a sack against the Kansas City Chiefs in a week 7 game of the 2006 season, Edwards became the 9th player in NFL history to become part of the 20/20 Club. He retired with career totals of 23.5 sacks and 28 interceptions, just nine short of the NFL record for most interceptions by a linebacker (37 by the Baltimore Colts' Don Shinnick).

At the conclusion of the 2006 NFL season, Edwards' contract was allowed to expire, making him a free agent.

During his tenure, Donnie took time to talk to and counsel youths who came to Chargers practice.

Second stint with Chiefs
On March 10, 2007 Edwards re-signed with the Kansas City Chiefs after his five-year stint with the San Diego Chargers.

Edwards was released by the Chiefs on February 24, 2009.

Philanthropy
Since retiring, Edwards has devoted himself full-time to philanthropy. He donates time and money to the charitable organizations and institutions that provided positive guidance during his youth. He hosts an annual 'Dad's Day with Donnie' in San Diego, California. The event provides children who are missing a father figure the unique opportunity to spend a day with professional athletes. He is also a dedicated supporter of the Child Abuse Prevention Foundation, After School All-Stars, the Best Defense Foundation, and Jump for Life.

Edwards also supports the U.S. military. Influenced by his studies in political science at UCLA and a grandfather who served in World War II, Edwards has participated in seven United Service Organization tours. In 2018, Donnie and his wife Kathryn, started the non-profit, Best Defense Foundation. The Foundation focuses on three pillar programs--Battlefield Returns take veterans back to their battlefields; Stronghold Transitions provides retreats for newly transitioning special force operators to focus on mental health; Education Initiative to promote the preservation of the legacy of those who have served in the military.

Personal life
Edwards travels between his two homes in Rancho Santa Fe, California and Brentwood, California with his German American wife Kathryn Edwards, née Eickstaedt (b. 16 October 1964); they appeared together on the sixth season of The Real Housewives of Beverly Hills.  He is a certified yoga instructor and has served as a brand ambassador for Jaeger-LeCoultre and Panerai watches.

He is of Mexican, Native American, and African American descent.

NFL career statistics

References

External links

 Kansas City Chiefs bio
 

1973 births
Living people
African-American players of American football
American football outside linebackers
American sportspeople of Mexican descent
Kansas City Chiefs players
Native American players of American football
People from Brentwood, Los Angeles
People from Rancho Santa Fe, California
Players of American football from California
San Diego Chargers players
Sportspeople from Chula Vista, California
UCLA Bruins football players
21st-century African-American sportspeople
20th-century African-American sportspeople